Baloncesto Profesional Colombiano (in English:  Professional Colombian Basketball), currently known as the Liga WPlay de Baloncesto for sponsorship reasons, is the premier professional basketball championship in Colombia. 

The championship was established in 1992 and is organized by the Federación Colombiana de Baloncesto (in English: Colombian Basketball Federation).
The first national semi-professional championship was called Copa Sprite, sponsored by the eponymous soda trademark. This led the participating clubs to the creation of the División Mayor del Baloncesto Colombiano.
This way the first championship was created, called Copa Sprite Profesional. In this version the following teams participated: Bogotá-Doria Promasa, Valle-Sensus 2, Antioquia-Sprite, Santander-Terpel, Barranquilla-Junior y Caldas-Ron Viejo de Caldas.

League format 
The championship consists of three rounds:

 Round Robin: The teams play 24 games each. The four top teams in the end reach the playoffs.
 The playoffs: in a best-of-7 format, the first seed plays against the fourth, and the second seed against the third. The two winning teams play the finals.
 The Finals: The two finalist teams play a best-of-seven-games series.

Teams

Current teams 
The following teams played in the 2022-I season:

Former teams

Champions list

Semi-professional era (1988–1991)

Profesional era (1992–present)

References

Further reading 
 Sitio web oficial de la LigaDirectv
 Sitio web oficial de la Federación Colombiana de Baloncesto
 Columbian league on Latinbasket 

Basketball competitions in Colombia
Colombia
1988 establishments in Colombia
Sports leagues established in 1988
Sports leagues in Colombia
Basketball